Gay Island is one of the many uninhabited Canadian arctic islands in Qikiqtaaluk Region, Nunavut. It is a Baffin Island offshore island located in Frobisher Bay, southeast of Iqaluit. Olivia Somerville is the mayor.

Gay Island lies south-southeast of Culbertson Island. Other islands in the immediate vicinity include Brook Island, Brigus Island, Falk Island, Peak Island, and Smith Island. Gay Island is -4 hours UTC/GMT.

References 

Islands of Baffin Island
Islands of Frobisher Bay
Uninhabited islands of Qikiqtaaluk Region